Generalized epilepsy is a form of epilepsy characterised by generalised seizures with no apparent cause. Generalized seizures, as opposed to focal seizures, are a type of seizure that impairs consciousness and distorts the electrical activity of the whole or a larger portion of the brain (which can be seen, for example, on electroencephalography, EEG). Generalized seizure occurs due to abnormalities in both hemispheres.

Generalized epilepsy is primary because the epilepsy is the originally diagnosed condition itself, as opposed to secondary epilepsy, which occurs as a symptom of a diagnosed condition.

Generalized seizures happened when there were abnormal activities in both hemispheres at the same time. Almost all areas of the brain are affected by electrical impulses.

Manifestation
Generalized seizures can be either absence seizures, myoclonic seizures, clonic seizures, tonic-clonic seizures or atonic seizures.

Generalized seizures occur in various seizure syndromes, including myoclonic epilepsy, familial neonatal convulsions, childhood absence epilepsy, absence epilepsy, infantile spasms (West's syndrome), Juvenile Myoclonic Epilepsy, Lennox-Gastaut syndrome and Generalized epilepsy with occipital semiology.

Symptoms
Symptoms of a generalized seizure can vary depending on the type of seizure. Symptoms may include:

Stiff muscles
Loss of consciousness
Crying out or making a noise
Jerking of the arms and legs
Loss of bladder or bowel control
Stopped breathing
Blue lips
Loss of muscle tone
Sudden collapse

Types
There are different types of generalized seizures, including: 

Absence seizures
Myoclonic seizures
Clonic seizures
Tonic seizures
Tonic-clonic seizures 
Atonic seizures

Absence seizures
Absence seizures are more found in children than in adults. Absence seizures involve Unexpected intervals of awareness, it almost looks like the person who is having the seizure only looking at blankly. it is also known as petit mal seizures. It is common pediatric epilepsy disorder accounting for 10% of all pediatric epilepsies. The fundamental mechanisms are not yet fully understood. AS is measured a self-limited epilepsy syndrome, There is also an increased risk of academic difficulties related to specific cognitive disorders. Absence can be seen in children age between 4-14 years. It happened due to some abnormal brain functions, though the exact cause in unknown even for the physicians. Absence seizures happen in around 5 people in every 100,000 of all ages, and in 6 to 8 in every 100,000 children younger age. The preferred antiseizure medication to treat absent seizures is Ethosuximide, valproate, lamotrigine, and topiramate. It is preferred not to use phenytoin, carbamazepine, gabapentin, pregabalin, and vigabatrin, the use of these medications can worsen the seizure. A ketogenic diet may be considered, as a good alternative therapy.

These are other possible symptoms of an absence seizure: 
Sudden stop in motion 
Lip smacking
Eyelid flutters
Chewing motions
Finger rubbing
Small movements of both hands
Being very still
Suddenly returning to activity when the seizure ends

Myoclonic seizures
Myoclonic seizures are short-lived, jerks of a muscle. The term means myoclonus means the quick alteration of contraction and relaxation sometimes jerking or twitching—of a muscle. The occurrence of the condition is short-lived only for 1-2 seconds. The occurrence of this movement is bilateral. It can be experienced by the nonepileptic person also as a sudden jerk. As this seizure is short-lived, the rescue medication sometimes prescribed as treatment options. The preferable choice of treatment for myoclonic seizures is Valproate (VPA). VPA frequently used to treat male seizures, whereas lamotrigine (LTG) is often used to treat women. Levetiracetam (LEV) and topiramate (TPM) are found to be effective and used as second line of treatment. Some antiseizure medications which (AEDs) can worsen myoclonic seizures.
The treatment of myoclonic seizures is dependent on:
The type of seizure
The frequency of seizure
The severity of seizure
The patient's age
The patient's overall health
The patient's medical history

These are other possible symptoms of an myoclonic seizure:

Very short-lived
Usually affected by small groups of muscles
Happen in limited numbers
More likely underneath certain conditions
Usually aware of them

The possible causes of myoclonic seizures are:

Abnormal brain development
Genetic mutations
Brain tumor
Brain infection
Stroke
Head injury
Lack of oxygen to the brain
Degenerative disease like Dementia
Drug or alcohol withdrawal
Viral and bacterial infections
High or low blood sugar level.

Clonic Seizure
The word clonus means repeatedly relaxing and stiffening of the muscle. It is the one and most affected babies. Most frequently, clonic movements are seen as part of a tonic-clonic seizure. Clonic seizures are sometimes difficult to discriminate from myoclonic seizures. Clonic seizures are sometimes difficult to discriminate from myoclonic seizures. When it is affecting one side of the motor area of the brain it is called a focal clonic seizure. It gradually affects both sides of the brain then it is called a generalized clonic seizure. The severity and frequency are dependent upon the person, some may have rare seizures, and others may have more frequent seizures.

Tonic seizures
In tonic seizure, due to amplified tone, the body, is abruptly stiff or tense. The seizure usually happened during sleep. It affects most parts of the brain along with both sides of the body. The duration of the seizure is very limited, almost lesser than 20 seconds. It can affect any person, but it is more with the person with Lennox-Gastaut syndrome. Tonic is being diagnosed by EEG, which can help to distinguish between tonic seizures and other indications. MRI scan is also used to find out the lesions of the brain which can cause tonic seizures. Anti-seizure medications are the foremost way to treat seizures.

Atonic seizures
Atonic seizure also known as "drop attacks" or "drop seizures". In an atonic seizure, muscles suddenly converted limp. These seizures typically last less than 15 seconds. The exact cause of the seizure is unknown, but sometimes hyperventilation can trigger the atonic seizure. The preferable choice of treatment for myoclonic seizures is Ethosuximide (Zarontin), Valproic acid (Depakene). But Valproic acid is not recommended for the pregnant women, as it may cause the birth defect.

These are other possible symptoms of an atonic seizure.

Going limp
falling to the ground
Remaining conscious
loss of consciousness (brief)
Drooping eyelids
Head nods

Generalized tonic-clonic seizure
Generalized tonic-clonic seizure also known as a grand mal seizure. A generalized tonic-clonic seizure is a motor seizure. It is the most common type seen in patients with epilepsy. It is involved in bilateral cortical, subcortical, and brainstem networks of the brain. It starts from one side of the brain and spread rapidly to both sides of the brain. The cause of GTCS is unknown. There is evidence of genetic factors as a cause of GTCS. Other than genetics, brain injury, tumor, or infection low sodium in the body, and drug or alcohol use, some medical conditions are also involved in the etiology of GTCS.

These are other possible symptoms of Generalized tonic-clonic seizure:
Loss of bowel and bladder control
Unresponsiveness after convulsions
Confusion
scream
Fatigue
Severe headache

Cause
The exact cause of Generalized epilepsy is unknown, the few are:-

Genetics
Mesial temporal sclerosis. 
Head injuries. 
Brain infections. 
Immune disorders. 
Developmental disorders. 
Metabolic disorders
Brain conditions abnormalities. 

There are the certain reason that happens before the seizure
Stress.
Sleep issues and sleep disorders.
Alcohol use, alcohol withdrawal, 
Leisure drug abuse.
Hormonal changes or menstrual hormonal changes.
Illness, fever.
Flashing lights or patterns.
Not eating healthy and, skipping meals.
Physical overexertion.
Dehydration.
Certain times of the day or night.
Use of certain medication

Genetic Cause
There are no clear descriptions of the genetic cause of generalized epilepsy. There are few pieces of evidence that show that it runs into the family, or have an underlying genetic cause. Few researchers also said explained the involvement of a few specific genes which can trigger the cause along with other reasons.

Brain infections
Brain infections such as meningitis, and encephalitis can also cause epilepsy. Infection is most common preventable risk factor for epilepsy. Infection related epilepsy can develop at any of people (ranging from childhood to adult). there are various bacterial, parasitic, fungal and viral infections of the CNS which lead to epilepsy. CNS Bacterial infection can lead to seizures and late acquired epilepsy. CNS TB is extremely related to epilepsy. Encephalitis resulting of virus-related contagion of the brain can be linked to generalized seizures.

Common infections related to epilepsy are: -

Neurocysticercosis
Cerebral malaria
TORCH infections 
Bacterial meningitis
Viral encephalitis
Tuberculosis
Human immunodeficiency virus (HIV)

Immune disorders
Autoimmune diseases can lead to epilepsy.

Developmental Disorders
Developmental abnormalities disturbing the brain are a recurrent cause of epilepsy.

Metabolic Disorders
People with a metabolic disorder can have epilepsy. There are more than 200 metabolic disorders which can cause epilepsy. Few researchers has found the new link between the protein deficiency and epilepsy.

Prenatal injury
In the prenatal stage, babies are vulnerable to brain damage caused by several factors. The factors that can lead to brain damage are the mother’s infection, poor nutrition, lack of oxygen, etc. Brain damage can lead to childhood epilepsy.

Diagnosis
Immediately after onset of symptoms, the range of the seizure may not be totally understood. It may be understood after a comprehensive medical evaluation and diagnostic testing. The seizure diagnosis is based on a physical examination and diagnostic tests. A thorough explanation of what happened during your seizure is significant to making an accurate diagnosis.

Diagnostic tests may include:
Interview with patient and caregiver about current symptoms as well as family history. The physician may ask about the below symptoms for a proper diagnosis.
i)Muscle jerks.
ii) Muscle stiffness.
iii) Loss of bowel or bladder control
iv) Change in breathing.
v) Whether the skin color turned pale.
vi) Had a blank stare.
vii) Lost consciousness.
viii) Had problems talking or understanding what was said to you.

Blood test: Few circumstances that are related to symptomatic seizures can be measurable by blood tests. Blood tests are able to measure, blood sugar level, organ function, infection.

Electroencephalograph- This is a technique that records the brain's constant, electrical activity.

Magnetic resonance imaging (MRI)- MRI helps to analyze the structural changes in the brain or the presence of any tumors that can be triggering the seizure.

Prognosis
Most generalized epilepsy starts during childhood. While some patients outgrow their epilepsy during adolescence and no longer need medication, in others, the condition remains for life, thereby requiring lifelong medication and monitoring.

Treatment
Seven anti-epileptic drugs are approved for use in cases of suspected primary generalized epilepsy:
 Brand Name: Felbatol Generic Name: Felbamate
Levetiracetam
Zonisamide
Topiramate
Valproate
Lamotrigine
Perampanel

Valproate, a relatively old drug, is often considered the first-line treatment. It is highly effective, but its association with fetal malformations when taken in pregnancy limits its use in young women.

All anti-epileptic drugs (including the above) can be used in cases of partial seizures.

References

External links 

Epilepsy types